The Volkswagen Golf Mk3 is a medium-sized compact family car. The third generation of the Volkswagen Golf and the successor to the Volkswagen Golf Mk2, which was produced by Volkswagen from August 1991 (for the 1992 model year) to 2002 (for Cabrio convertible). 

The Golf Mk3 was launched in mainland Europe in August 1991, in the United Kingdom in February 1992, and in North America in the spring of 1994. The delay in North America was due to Volkswagen's decision to supply U.S. and Canadian dealerships with Mk3 Golfs (and A3 Jettas) from the VW plant in Puebla, Mexico. Quality control problems led Volkswagen of America to reject Golfs and Jettas from Mexico. Thereafter, labor unrest at the plant delayed production. The third-generation Golf and Jetta first launched in North America as 1993 models in the San Diego, California area and in Canada, then in the autumn in the rest of North America as 1994 models.  

The Mk3 Cabrio replaced the Volkswagen Cabriolet. The Mk3 Cabrio continued until the 2002 model year, when Volkswagen replaced it with a convertible version of the Volkswagen New Beetle. 

Like the previous two generations, the Mk3 supposed to be built at the TAS factory in Sarajevo, Bosnia and Herzegovina. However, when the car was first released the Yugoslav War broke out, leading to the destruction of the factory. Due to this, TAS went bankrupt in 1995. This meant the Mk3 was the only Golf before the Mk4 not to be built in Bosnia and Herzegovina, although a single Mk3 managed to roll off the assembly line in Sarajevo, its fate unknown. 

The Mk3 Golf was sold in Japan alongside the Polo, where both vehicles complied with the small size class regulations that encouraged sales. 

The Volkswagen Golf Mk3 began to be replaced with the October 1997 (model year 1998) introduction of the Volkswagen Golf Mk4. In some markets, the Mk3 Golf continued to be available for model year 1998 (Americas, South Africa), and even as early model year 1999 vehicles (Canada, Mexico, US).

Models

Variant
For the first time an estate was produced, being launched in early 1993, and bringing it into line with key competitors such as the Ford Escort and Vauxhall/Opel Astra, which had long been available as estates. The GT variants included a 2.8LVR6 engine, and a convertible launched as the Cabrio (Type 1E).

Cabriolet
The Volkswagen Golf Mk3 Cabrio (or Type 1E) was introduced in 1994 for the 1995 model year, replacing the previous MK1 Rabbit based Cabriolet. It was facelifted in 1998 (mid-1999 for non-euro markets) with the front, rear, and steering wheel styling inspired by the Golf Mk4 while still maintaining the body from the Mk3 Cabrio. These Cabrios are often referred to as the Mk3.5 Cabrios. The Volkswagen Golf Cabrio was discontinued in 2002 with a special edition called "Last Edition".

A59

The cancelled Golf A59 was intended to be a 4WD model with a 275HP turbocharged 1998cc engine, carbon fiber and Kevlar shell, and a full roll cage, and have the highest performance of the Mk3 Golf models. The A59 was also supposed to be able to win the World Rally Championship in 1994. The prototype can be seen at the Volkswagen Museum.

Features

A 16-valve version of the third-generation Golf GTI was introduced in 1993. The engine was enlarged to 2.0L, with power now reaching 150PS (110kW/148hp). While lower powered than the VR6, it was still relatively popular with driving enthusiasts in Europe, because it offered similar power without the thirst or tax burden of a 6 cylinder. As with previous versions the Golf Driver acted as the official GTI-look-alike in the United Kingdom. Similar to the continental market Golf GT, it looked sporting but was fitted with a single-point injected 1.8L engine.

The Golf Mk3 was also the predecessor of the "diesel craze" that swept through Europe in the late 1990s and early 2000s, when Volkswagen introduced the direct-injection system with the  Golf TDI in 1993.

From its launch, all versions of the Golf came with fuel injection, to meet EEC requirements that all new cars sold in member countries from January 1993 must come with fuel injection or a catalytic converter. Non-catalyzed models were also built for those markets where there was no interest in them; power outputs were the same as for the catalyzed models. An all-new 1.4 petrol engine was the entry-level model in the MK2 Golf range.

Also offered was a naturally aspirated version of the 1.9 L diesel engine, the SDI, offering .

Airbags were first offered on the Golf in 1992, and from 1996 anti-lock brakes were standard across the range.

The Golf Mk3 was also available in "Ecomatic" form. It was powered with a diesel engine and a clutch-less manual transmission. The vehicle would freewheel by opening of the clutch as soon as the accelerator is released, and the engine was switched off after a further 1.5 seconds of inactivity, whether by stopping or coasting. Restarting the engine simply required depressing the accelerator pedal. VW had previously pioneered similar technology in the VW Polo "Formel E" in the 1980s.

There was also a limited production run of around 250 "CitySTROMer" vehicles, mainly sold to the German market, which were fully electric vehicles, incorporating six lead-acid batteries in the engine bay, and a further 10 underneath the luggage area. It had a range of approximately 50 km. The vehicle could be filled with a small amount of diesel to provide heat for the cabin.

As had happened with the Mk1 and Mk2, the Mk3 remained available in US for a year after it was discontinued in Europe (1998). The Mk3 continued to be produced for the 1999 model year where it was sold in North and South America. These 1999 Mk3 cars were the last produced in the world and sold alongside the Mk4 in showrooms.

Awards
 1997 Which? Magazine Best Buys: Best Family Car
European Car of the Year: 1992
 1992 What Car?: Car of the Year

Mk3 special editions

20th Anniversary GTI
Volkswagen produced a limited quantity of 1000 special-edition 3 and 5 door GTI Anniversary models, celebrating 20 years of the GTI model. This had the usual GTI specification but came equipped with special checkered Recaro front sport seats and matching rear seats bearing the GTI logo, red seat belts front and rear, half-chromed and leather golf ball gear knob, red stitched leather steering wheel and handbrake gaiter. The release knob on the hand brake was also red and silver instrument dials. Floor mats also had red piping along their edges. The red theme continued externally with a red striping on the bumpers and red brake calipers. The wheels were 16" x 7" split rim BBS RS 722 alloys, visually similar to the 15" that were found on VR6 model. Also featured were brushed stainless-steel rear twin tailpipes on the exhaust and smoked front fog and indicator lamps to match the rear lamps. 3 optional extras were made available: electric sunroof, air conditioning and metallic black paintwork. Insurance was based on the standard GTI which made this version a very desirable model. The edition was sold in only 6 color schemes and the 1000 number figures that were produced was as follows: 600 8 valve models, 150 16 valve models and 250 TDI models. The diesel model was only produced for the European market and was not sold in the UK. Unfortunately, many of the models fell into the UK company car and lease market prior to the second-hand market and it believed only a few hundred still survive. However, another factor in the rarity of Mark 3 Golfs, unlike the excellent build quality of the Mark 2, at least in the UK, is the very low-quality steel sourced by VW on some occasions, and used across the range, from entry model to VR6. According to independent mechanics and parts specialists, and MOT testers, the floor-pan, both door sills, and rear hatch can suffer severe rot and disintegration, and anybody planning to buy one is advised to check for rot, and holes and patches to the floor-pan.

Otmar Alt
The Gold Otmar Alt is a limited (1000 cars were built) edition version of the Golf. It featured various artworks from the artist Otmar Alt and a fully customized interior with the same graphics.

Rabbit
The Golf 3 Rabbit Edition was exclusive to Austria, and it featured a special rabbit badge.

Cool
The Golf Cool just featured a "Cool" sticker, like Avenue, and other minor design changes.

CitySTROMer
The Golf CitySTROMer was an alternative electric powered version of the Golf 3, which also featured colorful graphics on the side panels.

Highline
As the name suggests, the Golf Highline was the high end, premium version of the Mk3 Golf, and it shows that with a full leather interior, wood accents and a "Highline" sticker on the trunk.

Coast
The Golf Coast was a Cabrio-exclusive limited edition, and it featured the "Coast" graphic on the trunk.

Sport
Just like the name, it was the sporty version of the Golf 3, which also featured a "Sport Edition" sticker.

Classic
The Golf Classic had an overall retro look and a "Classic Edition" silicon badge.

Limited
Just like the "Edition" edition of the Golf 4 Variant, it came packed with special features and the "Limited Edition" graphic on the inside step with a similar font.

GTI/VR6 Edition
They featured their respective body-kit, "GTI/VR6 Edition" badges on the side and the GTI Edition also featured a sticker on the rear quarter panel that matches the font from the seats.

Kamei
"Kamei Edition" was a limited edition made by the Wolfsburg-based aftermarket body parts manufacturer Kamei.
It had the full Kamei kit and a "Kamei Edition" badge on the grille, offset to the right side.

Ryder
It featured small design changes but did not have a sunroof.

Driver's Edition GTI VR6 (North America)
1997 Model Year. It came in two colors Ginster Yellow and Jazz Blue. It also had red stitching on the steering wheel, special half aluminum - half leather golf ball shift knob with GTI logo, silver gauge faces, 15" seven spoke alloy wheels made by Speedline and brake calipers painted red. Most of the extras became standard on the 1998 GTI VR6 causing some confusion as to what a Driver's Edition is. The VIN can be used to confirm if a car is a Driver's Edition or not.

Henri Leconte
It featured a leather interior with signed seats and a sticker representing 3D ball breaking the glass on the rear window.

Henri Lloyd Yachting
The GT based edition had a special front lip, rear bumper extension and a special grille, besides the rear badge.

Driver
This regular Golf 3 received the GTI body-kit, together with the "Orlando" alloy rims and a small trunk spoiler.

SE
Produced from 1996 to 1997 for the UK market, the SE featured a GTI body-kit, all round tinted glass, clear front indicator covers, twin headlamp lenses and GTI taillights, silver instrument cluster and Sport Räder alloy wheels.

Match
This version came pre-packed with a Sony CD player, power steering, 6 spoke rims and "Match" graphics ("///Match" written on the sides near the front wheel arch and above the guard rail, and only the three "///" blue, red and green lines below the right taillight.)

Match II
Just like the first "Match" it featured "Match II" graphics, but this time in the shape of a metallic badge under the "Golf" and "TDI" logos. It also featured a custom interior with a unique fabric design.

Color Concept
Was a highly limited edition made in only 5 colors (Flash Red, Salsa Green, Yellow, Jazz Blue Pearl Effect and Black Magic Pearl Effect) and a few of each produced. They featured a leather interior matching the outside color (with Color Concept embossed on the front seats) and the Color Concept badge. 15-inch BBS Solitude alloy wheels were included, as were electric windows, central locking and front seat heating. The Color Concept was available on the Cabriolet and Estate (Variant) version of the Golf as well.

Family
It was just the regular Golf MK3, but only with a custom sticker and a few other minor differences.

Harlequin

The Golf Harlequin model began with a group of four cars, each carrying a Design Series emblem, created by Volkswagen to display on the 1995 international auto show circuit.

Basing the design on an earlier Volkswagen Polo Harlequin special edition, the Golf Harlequins were created in four variations, by taking four solid color models and interchanging the easily detachable doors, hood, hatch, grill, fenders and bumper facias — after final production at the Puebla, Mexico assembly plant where all the Harlequins were manufactured.

The interchangement of colors — Tornado Red, Ginster Yellow, Chagall Blue, and Pistachio Green — was not random, but followed four defined assignments, with each pattern avoiding adjacent major panels sharing the same paint color.

Chagall Blue, and Pistachio Green were otherwise unavailable as a Golf paint color choice in North America.

The resulting Harlequins were designated by their "base" color, the paint color of the welded panels comprising the core body — including the substructure, roof and C-pillar.

Following a positive response to the original four Harlequins, Volkswagen marketed an additional 60 — followed by another 200.

In a series of follow up letters to various entities at Volkswagen, the total number of Harlequins is reported variously from 275 to 264, all offered solely for model year 1996, in the United States, Canada, and Mexico — with most marketed in the United States.

Each Harlequin Golf featured a gray/black interior highlighting the four body colors. The special edition was available for an additional $150 over their stock counterparts.

TREK / K2 Editions

In 1997, a marketing effort with TREK on the Jetta Mk3 was expanded to include the Golf Mk3. The TREK edition came with a roof bike carrier, a 21-speed purple TREK-Volkswagen branded mountain bike, and a TREK 'Limited Edition' badge.

Also in 1997, the other special edition, The K2, came with a ski/snowboard roof carrier, a K2 "Limited Edition" badge, and either a pair of K2 El Camino skis, or a K2 Juju snowboard.

Both TREK and K2 editions also included special Recaro manufactured seats, 14” alloy wheels, tinted taillights, special “TREK” or “K2” shift knobs, optional moonroof, roof-mounted antenna, and fog lights.

Wolfsburg Edition

A Wolfsburg Edition was produced alongside other Mk3 "Wolfsburg Edition" Jetta's in the United States. Like the Wolfsburg Edition Jetta, Mk3 Golfs with the Wolfsburg package came standard with an improved white/tan dual-tone interior, smoked tail-lamps, premium alloy wheels, remote entry, power windows/mirrors, and an tilt/slide sunroof. The Wolfsburg Edition was only available with the VW 8-valve SOHC 2.0L engine.

During the 1990s, Volkswagen sponsored three high-profile rock bands' European tours, and issued a special-edition Golf, with distinctive exterior markings, for each: the Golf Pink Floyd Edition (1994), the Golf Rolling Stones Edition (1995), and the Golf Bon Jovi Edition (1996).

European Car of the Year
The Golf MK3 was voted European Car of the Year for 1992 - the first Volkswagen to win this award.

Engine choices

See also

Volkswagen A platform
Volkswagen Golf
VDub
list of discontinued Volkswagen Group petrol engines
list of discontinued Volkswagen Group diesel engines
Hot hatch
Small family car

References

External links

 Golf at Volkswagen International

Golf 3
Compact cars
Front-wheel-drive vehicles
All-wheel-drive vehicles
Hatchbacks
Station wagons
Cars introduced in 1991
2000s cars
Cars powered by VR engines
Electric cars